Alvah Washington Townley Farmstead Historic District, also known as Osage County Museum, is a historic farm and national historic district located at Chamois, Osage County, Missouri.  It encompasses five contributing buildings.  They are the two-story, frame I-house (c. 1856) with modest Greek Revival styling; a smokehouse (c. 1875); multipurpose barn (c. 1872); wood and machine shed (c. 1874); and a combination poultry house, outhouse, and storage shed (c. 1870).  The property was deeded it to the Osage County Historical Society, who operate it as a museum.

It was listed on the National Register of Historic Places in 2003.

References

External links
Townley House Museum

History museums in Missouri
Historic districts on the National Register of Historic Places in Missouri
Farms on the National Register of Historic Places in Missouri
Houses completed in 1856
Buildings and structures in Osage County, Missouri
National Register of Historic Places in Osage County, Missouri